The South East Melbourne Magic was an Australian basketball team based in Melbourne. The Magic competed in the National Basketball League (NBL) between 1992 and 1998, and played their home games at Rod Laver Arena.

In their seven seasons, the Magic contested four NBL Grand Finals and won two championships, their first coming in their debut season and their second coming in 1996. Following their loss in the 1998 Grand Final to the Adelaide 36ers, the Magic merged with the North Melbourne Giants to become the Victoria Titans for the 1998/99 season.

Honour roll

Season by season

References

External links

 
Basketball teams in Melbourne
Defunct National Basketball League (Australia) teams
Basketball teams established in 1992
Basketball teams disestablished in 1998
1992 establishments in Australia
1998 disestablishments in Australia